The Ukrainian Cup 2003–04 was the 13th annual edition of Ukraine's football knockout competition, known as the Ukrainian Cup. Shakhtar Donetsk won the title, defeating FC Dnipro Dnipropetrovsk in the final.

Round and draw dates
All draws held at FFU headquarters (Building of Football) in Kyiv unless stated otherwise.

Competition Schedule

First round

Second round

Third Round

Quarterfinals 

|}

Semifinals 

|}

Final 

Ukrainian Cup seasons
Cup
Ukrainian Cup